Murray McIntosh (born November 17, 1967) is a Canadian former professional ice hockey defenceman.

McIntosh played nine season of professional hockey in Germany, including three seasons (1994–1997) in the Deutsche Eishockey Liga where he skated with both the Kassel Huskies and Wedemark Scorpions.

References

1967 births
Living people
Canadian ice hockey defencemen
Hannover Scorpions players
Kassel Huskies players
Ice hockey people from Calgary
Canadian expatriate ice hockey players in Germany